Venancio Johnson Paras Jr. (born October 2, 1968), better known as Benjie Paras, is a Filipino actor, comedian, and a retired professional basketball player who played for Shell Turbo Chargers and San Miguel Beermen of the Philippine Basketball Association (PBA). He is the only PBA player to win both Rookie of the Year and Most Valuable Player honors, in a single season (1989). As its star center, Paras led the Shell Turbo Chargers to championship titles.

Early career

High school 
Paras played with the San Beda Red Cubs together with Ronnie Magsanoc and Eric Altamirano.

Collegiate 
Paras played for the UP Fighting Maroons in the UAAP. In 1986, the UP Fighting Maroons won the championship. Paras played with Magsanoc, Altamirano, Joey Guanio, and future UP champion head coach Goldwin Monteverde under the guidance of Joe Lipa.

Professional career

Shell Turbo Chargers (1989–2002)
Drafted by the Shell Turbo Chargers in 1989, Paras, aptly nicknamed "The Tower of Power", played in the PBA with ball-handling, powerful rebounding, deft mid-range shooting, well-timed shot blocks and the uncanny ability for inside scoring. Although Shell did not win any titles that season, these abilities overshadowed even the most skilled of players and because of these he not only took Rookie of the Year, but also became its Most Valuable Player. Paras, as of 2020, is the only PBA player to have done this feat.

In 1990, Paras would lead Shell to their first Open Conference title by defeating Anejo Rhum in a championship series that finished in 6 games, the climax featured a walkout by Anejo players. In 1991, Shell and Ginebra would meet again in the Finals of the Reinforced Conference. Paras and the Turbo Chargers seemed poised to beat the Gins once again after taking a commanding 3–1 lead, but the Gins made a dramatic rally and coming back from the 3–1 deficit and winning the title in a classic Game 7 encounter that featured Rudy Distrito's game winner.

In 1992, Paras and the rejuvenated Turbo Chargers, now with Leo Isaac and Rey Cuenco, led Shell to another title, winning it over the San Miguel Beermen. After the 1992 title, Paras and Shell would show inconsistencies as it flirted to the cellars in several occasions. This was also capped with a controversy back in 1993 when Paras sat out for one conference after a contract dispute with Shell that prompted him to demand a trade deal to rival team Anejo Rhum. But after Shell rejected trade offers for their prized center, he decided to concentrate on his movie and TV career. After Paras came back to the team in the 1993 PBA Commissioner's Cup, the team never made it back to the Finals until the 1996 Commissioner's Cup, thanks in part to import Kenny Redfield and supporting casts such as Peter Naron, Richie Ticzon, Victor Pablo, and Jojo Lim. In 1996, they battled the grandslam seeking Alaska Aces, then known as the Alaska Milkmen, in an unbelievable seven-game series which Alaska won. Paras was also a contender to win the MVP in the 1996 season of the PBA.

Paras would then re-enter the Finals 2 years later in the Centennial Cup Finals, this time meeting the Mobiline Phone Pals. In a one-game title showdown, Shell came up short. Paras would get his revenge thanks to the help of Noy Castillo and Gerald Esplana as the rematch was set for the Governor's Cup Finals of the PBA against Mobiline. Shell came back after trailing the series 3 games to 2. Shell and Mobiline battled into a gruelling 7 games until Shell prevailed due to timely baskets by Paras and Esplana.

In 1999, Paras dominated the Filipino-American laden PBA by leading Shell to another Finals appearance, this time against Tanduay Rhum Makers bannered by Fil-Am Eric Menk and the deported Sonny Alvarado. Paras held his own against the two taller, stronger and more athletic Fil-Ams as he led Shell to another title winning it 4–2. That would be Paras' last title, as his team was unable to stop the San Miguel Beermen in the title showdown for the Commissioner's Cup. Paras would win his 2nd MVP since 1989.

San Miguel Beermen (2002–2003)
During the 2000s, Paras played in 44 games and had ongoing injuries. In 2003, Paras ended his basketball career. However, he returned later in the year, suiting up for San Miguel Beer before retiring once again at the end of the season. Paras accumulated 10,322 career points throughout his 574 games.

National team career
Paras was also selected to play in the 1990 Asian Games Basketball Team that won the silver medal, but the team came up short against China in the gold-medal match.

Coaching career
In 2013, Paras returned to basketball as an assistant coach for the San Beda Red Lions. In 2014, Paras became one of the members of the PBA Legends Team that played in Asia Tour Singapore.

Acting career
Paras retired in 2003, ending his 14-year career with the Philippine Basketball Association and became an actor. He recently played for NBA Asia Challenge in 2011 with his fellow former and current PBA Stars and NBA Stars.

He has acted in local films and television shows.  He appeared in Narito Ang Puso Ko, his first drama series on GMA Network, he also appeared in a former sitcom, Lagot Ka, Isusumbong Kita, a weekly sitcom by GMA and also starred in Encantadia, as the Ascano barbarian, Wahid. He was also the host of ABC's local version of Guinness Book of Records. He also flexed his acting muscles by playing offbeat roles in Lupin (as Richard Gutierrez's gay inmate) and Fantastic Man (as one of Mark Herras' villains). In late 2007, he became one of main casts in Ramon "Bong" Revilla's movie, Resiklo, which is an entry in Metro Manila Film Festival. He was also the main host for the short-lived late night ABC 5 (now TV5) game show, WinWinWin. In November 2007, he was cast as one of the fictional characters for Richard Gutierrez's former fantaserye on GMA 7, Kamandag, as Haring Dinggol, king of the human-apes. Paras recently finished his GMA 7 comedy teleserye, Adik Sa'Yo with Marvin Agustin and Jolina Magdangal.  Benjie Paras also worked with boxer Manny Pacquiao in a GMA 7 Sitcom, Show Me Da Manny.  Paras was back again on GMA Telebabad for the role as a villain in a recent drama-fantaserye, The Last Prince. Benjie returns to comedy via a reality comedy show, Ang Yaman ni Lola. Benjie returns once again in a 1st Christmas reality show and is now included in a newest GMA 7 Christmas reality show, Puso Ng Pasko: Artista Challenge which he was a challenger. Benjie returns to drama again via Bantatay which he plays Jace Ventura, a pet detective.  Benjie is now on his former show a horror-comedy anthology, Spooky Nights Presents: The Ringtone. Benjie returns to comedy again and his 4th fantaserye Alice Bungisngis And Her Wonder Walis in 2012.

Paras played as the best friend of Vic Sotto in the movie Iskul Bukol 20 Years After (Adventures of Vic Ungasis and the Escalera Brothers) and the best friend of Vhong Navarro's best friend in the movie My Only U.

In mid-2012, Benjie Paras returned to  the drama again in a romantic teleserye One True Love.

Personal life
Paras is married to Lyxen Diomampo, a former pre-school teacher and commercial model. They have two sons, Riley and Sam, and a daughter, Georja. Paras had two sons from a previous marriage, Andre and Kobe; both have basketball careers and started playing for La Salle Greenhills basketball team in grade school. André is also an actor at GMA 7, while Kobe played in the US NCAA Division I having played collegiate ball for the Creighton University in Omaha, Nebraska, the California State University, Northridge. and for UP Fighting Maroons. Kobe currently plays for Niigata Albirex BB in Japan.

Filmography

TV Shows
{| class="wikitable sortable" 
|- 
! Year
! Title
! Role
! Network
|-
| rowspan="3"|1989
| Last Two Minutes The Sitcom 
|
| PTV 4
|-
| Ang Tabi Kong Mamaw
|
| IBC
|-
| Young Love, Sweet Love
| Various roles 
| 9TV
|-
| 1990-1992
| Estudyante Blues
| 
| PTV 4
|-
|
| Palibhasa Lalake
| 
| ABS-CBN
|-
|
| Just The 3 Of Us 
| 
| 9TV
|-
| 1993-1998
| Oki Doki Doc 
| 
| ABS-CBN
|-
|
| Haybol Rambol 
| 
| rowspan="6"|GMA Network 
|-
| 1998-2003
| Kool Ka Lang
| Jie
|-
| 2003-2004
| Narito Ang Puso Ko 
| Boyong
|-
|
| Kakabaka-Boo 
|
|-
|
| Kakabakaba Adventures 
| 
|-
| 2003-2007
| Lagot Ka, Isusumbong Kita 
| Junior
|-
|
| Guinness Book Of World Records Philippine Edition 
| 
| TV5
|-
|
| Naks! 
| 
| rowspan=7|GMA Network 
|-
|
| Wag Kukurap
| Various roles 
|-
|
| GMA Telecine Specials 
| Various roles 
|-
|
| Campus Romance 
|
|-
|
| Mikee 
|
|-
|
| Dear Mikee 
|
|-
|
| Sa Dako Pa Roon 
|
|-
|
| Gags Must Be Crazy 
| 
| IBC
|-
|
| My Guardian Abby 
|
| QTV
|-
| 2005
| Encantadia 
| rowspan=3| Wahid
| rowspan=3|GMA Network
|-
| 2005-2006
| Etheria 
|-
| rowspan=3|2006
| Encantadia: Pag-ibig Hanggang Wakas
|-
| Family Zoo 
|
| QTV
|-
| Love to Love
|
| rowspan=8|GMA Network
|-
| rowspan="6"|2007
| Lupin
| Generoso/Jenny
|-
| Mga Kuwento ni Lola Basyang
| Higanteng Amok
|-
| Fantastic Man 
| Gobo
|-
| Magic Kamison 
| Pancho
|-
| Boys Nxt Door 
| Badong
|-
| Kamandag 
| Dinggol
|-
| 2007-2022
| Maynila
| Various roles
|-
|
| Finish Line 
| 
| 9TV
|-
|
| Win Win Win 
|
| ABC
|-
| 2008-2014
| Maalaala Mo Kaya 
| Various roles 
| ABS-CBN
|-
| 2008-2009
| Gagambino 
| Stalin
| rowspan=2|GMA Network
|-
| rowspan=2|2009
| Adik Sa'Yo 
| Benjo
|-
| Clear Men Future League
| 
| SOLAR TV
|-
| 2009–2011
| Show Me Da Manny 
| Oscar Paredes
| rowspan=10|GMA Network 
|-
| rowspan=4|2010
|The Last Prince 
| Rizayo
|-
| Ang Yaman ni Lola 
| Benjo Cabagnot
|-
| Puso ng Pasko: Artista Challenge 
| Challenger
|-
| Bantatay 
| Jace
|-
| rowspan=3|2011
| Spooky Nights Presents: The Ringtone 
|
|-
| Futbolilits 
| Harrison Fortunato
|-
| Manny Many Prizes 
| Co-host 
|-
| rowspan=3|2012
| Alice Bungisngis and her Wonder Walis
| Timoteo/Tim
|-
| One True Love 
| Douglas
|-
| Toda Max 
| Benjo
| ABS-CBN
|-
| rowspan=3|2013
| Wagas 
| Various roles 
| GMA News TV
|-
| Got to Believe (TV series) 
| Chito Tampipi
| ABS-CBN
|-
| Video Incredible 
|
| TV5
|-
| 2013-2016
| Wansapanataym| Various roles 
| ABS-CBN
|-
| 2014
| Tunay Na Buhay 
| Guest
| GMA Network
|-
| 2015-2019
| NBA Sabados sa Dos| Sports Commentator 
| ABS-CBN
|-
| rowspan=4|2015
| Nathaniel 
| Abner Bartolome
| ABS-CBN
|-
| The Half Sisters 
| Peter
| rowspan=2|GMA Network
|-
| Sabado Badoo 
| Guest
|-
| And I Love You So 
| 
| ABS-CBN 
|-
| 2016-2020
| Dear Uge 
| Various roles 
| rowspan=3|GMA Network
|-
| 2016
| Tsuperhero 
| Makutoks
|-
| 2016-2017
| Trops 
| Coach Fred
|-
| rowspan=2|2017
| The Promise of Forever 
| Geoffrey Madrid
| ABS-CBN
|-
| The Lolas' Beautiful Show| Guest
| GMA Network
|-
| 2017-2019
| Ipaglaban Mo 
| Various roles 
| ABS-CBN
|-
| rowspan=4|2018
| Bagani| Bernardo Carpio
| ABS-CBN
|-
| Victor Magtanggol 
| Erwin Bravo
| rowspan=4|GMA Network
|-
| Barangay 143| Abdul's Voice
|-
| Daddy's Gurl 
| Tom
|-
| rowspan=2|2019
| The Boobay and Tekla Show 
| Guest
|-
| Ipaglaban Mo 
| Various roles 
| ABS-CBN
|-
| 2019-2022 
| Prima Donnas 
| Agaton
| rowspan=2|GMA Network
|-
| rowspan=6|2020
| Mars Pa More 
| Guest
|-
| Fill In The Bank| Celebrity Player 
| rowspan=3|TV5
|-
| Sunday Kada| Guest
|- 
| Lunch Out Loud 
| Guest
|-
| Iba Yan! 
| Guest 
| Kapamilya Channel, A2Z 11
|-
| Kaibigan The Series 
| 
| GMA Network
|-
| rowspan=3|2021
| Wanted Ang Serye 
| 
| TV5
|-
| I Can See You Season 2 
|
| GMA Network
|-
| Sing Galing 
| 
| TV5
|-
| 2021-2022
| Agimat ng Agila 
| Sgt. Wesley Dimanahan
| rowspan=3|GMA Network
|-
| rowspan="2"|2022
| Jose and Maria's Bonggang Villa| Mr. Rico Nero
|- 
| Regal Studio Presents
|
|-
| 2023
|  The Iron Heart  
| Jared
| Kapamilya Channel
|}

Movies
 Last Two Minutes (Regal Entertainment, 1989) - Benjie's Debut Movie 
 May Isang Tsuper Ng Taxi (FPJ Productions, 1990) 
 Bulag, Pipi At Bingi (Regal Entertainment, 1993)
 Dunkin Donato (Moviestars Production Inc. 1993)
 Mga Siyanong Parak (Regal Entertainment, 1993)
 Greggy en' Boogie: Sakyan mo na lang, Anna (Regal Entertainment, 1994)
 Exodus: Tales From Enchanted Kingdom (Ignite Media Productions & Imus Productions, 2005) - Benjie's 1st Action Movie
 Resiklo (Imus Productions, 2007)
 My Best Friend's Girlfriend (GMA Films & Regal Entertainment, 2008)
 My Only U! (Star Cinema, 2008)
 Iskul Bukol 20 Years After (M-Zet/APT Entertainment/OctoArts Films, 2008)
 Wapakman (Solar Entertainment, 2009)
 Ang Panday (GMA Films, 2009)
 Si Agimat At Si Enteng Kabisote (GMA Films/M-Zet/APT Entertainment/OctoArts Films/Imus Productions, 2010)
 Ang Panday 2 (GMA Films, 2011)
 My Lady Boss (GMA Films, 2012)
 Ibong Adarna: The Pinoy Adventure (Gurion Entertainment, 2014)
 Past Tense (Star Cinema, 2014)
 Papa's Boy (CMB Productions, 2015)
 Wang Fam (Viva Films, 2015) - Benjie's 1st VIVA Films Movie
 Lumayo Ka Nga Sa Akin (Viva Films, 2016) - post production
 Dear Future Husband (Viva Films & Star Cinema, 2017) - pre production
 Barbi: D' Wonder Beki (OctoArts Films & APT Entertainment, 2017)
 Mang Kepweng 2: Ang Lihim Ng Bandanang Itim (Star Cinema & CineKo Productions, 2020)
 And I Love You So'' (ABS-CBN, 2015)

Awards and achievements

PBA
 4x PBA Champion (1990, 1992, 1998 & 1999)
 2-time Most Valuable Player  (1989 & 1999)
 Rookie of the Year (1989)
 5-time Mythical First Team Selection (1989, 1990, 1991, 1995 & 1999)
 3-time Mythical Second Team Selection (1992, 1994 & 1996)
 Best Player of the Conference (1999 Commissioner's Cup)
 Comeback Player of the Year (1999)
 Eight-time PBA All-Star
 2-time PBA All-Star Game Most Valuable Player (1994 & 1999)
 PBA's 25 Greatest Players of All-Time

Philippine national team
 Member of the 1990 Asian Games national team (silver medal)

References

External links
SMB Recharged

Sparkle GMA Artist Center profile

1968 births
Living people
21st-century Filipino male actors
Asian Games medalists in basketball
Asian Games silver medalists for the Philippines
Basketball players at the 1990 Asian Games
Centers (basketball)
Filipino male comedians
Filipino male television actors
Filipino television sportscasters
ABS-CBN personalities
GMA Network personalities
Medalists at the 1990 Asian Games
People from Santa Mesa
Philippine Basketball Association All-Stars
Philippine Basketball Association players with retired numbers
Philippines men's national basketball team players
Filipino men's basketball players
San Miguel Beermen players
Shell Turbo Chargers players
Basketball players from Manila
UP Fighting Maroons basketball players
Shell Turbo Chargers draft picks
Filipino male film actors